Ethan Hughes (born 7 December 1994) is an Australian rules footballer who plays for the Fremantle Football Club in the Australian Football League (AFL).

Early career

Originally from Bunbury Western Australia, he was drafted with the 13th selection in the 2015 Rookie Draft from Swan Districts in the West Australian Football League (WAFL). In 2015 he played for Peel Thunder in the West Australian Football League (WAFL), Fremantle's reserve team.

AFL career

Hughes was named to make his AFL debut for Fremantle in the final round of the 2015 AFL season, during Fremantle's round twenty three clash against Port Adelaide at the Adelaide Oval. Twelve changes were made to Fremantle's team, and Hughes was one of four players to make their AFL debuts.

Hughes signed a contract extension during the 2016 AFL season tying him to Fremantle until at least the end of 2017.

After missing the opening two rounds of the 2017 AFL season, Hughes featured in every game except Fremantle’s round 12 visit to Brisbane playing 18 games and kicking his first goal.

Hughes only played five games during the 2018 AFL season and signed a one year contract extension at the end of 2018.

The 2019 AFL season saw Hughes play 21 out of a possible 22 games.

Statistics
 Statistics are correct to the end of round 10, 2022

|- style="background-color: #EAEAEA"
! scope="row" style="text-align:center" | 2015
|
| 42 || 1 || 0 || 0 || 12 || 10 || 22 || 8 || 3 || 0.0 || 0.0 || 12.0 || 10.0 || 22.0 || 8.0 || 3.0
|-
! scope="row" style="text-align:center" | 2016
|
| 15 || 5 || 0 || 0 || 41 || 36 || 77 || 24 || 13 || 0.0 || 0.0 || 8.2 || 7.2 || 15.4 || 4.8 || 2.6
|- style="background-color: #EAEAEA"
! scope="row" style="text-align:center" | 2017
|
| 15 || 18 || 1 || 0 || 157 || 130 || 287 || 93 || 31 || 0.1 || 0.0 || 8.7 || 7.2 || 15.9 || 5.2 || 1.7
|-
! scope="row" style="text-align:center" | 2018
|
| 15 || 5 || 1 || 0 || 37 || 29 || 66 || 18 || 5 || 0.2 || 0.0 || 7.4 || 5.8 || 13.2 || 3.6 || 1.0
|- style="background-color: #EAEAEA"
! scope="row" style="text-align:center" | 2019
|
| 15 || 21 || 2 || 2 || 176 || 159 || 335 || 100 || 27 || 0.1 || 0.1 || 8.4 || 7.6 || 16.0 || 4.8 || 1.3
|-
! scope="row" style="text-align:center" | 2020
|
| 15 || 17 || 0 || 0 || 140 || 77 || 217 || 79 || 20 || 0.0 || 0.0 || 8.2 || 4.5 || 12.8 || 4.6 || 1.2
|- style="background-color: #EAEAEA"
! scope="row" style="text-align:center" | 2021
|
| 15 || 8 || 0 || 1 || 75 || 64 || 139 || 29 || 12 || 0.0 || 0.1 || 9.4 || 8.0 || 17.4 || 3.6 || 1.5
|-
! scope="row" style="text-align:center" | 2022
|
| 15 || 0 || – || – || – || – || – || – || – || – || – || – || – || – || – || –
|- class="sortbottom"
! colspan=3| Career
! 75
! 4
! 3
! 638
! 505
! 1143
! 351
! 111
! 0.1
! 0.0
! 8.5
! 6.7
! 15.2
! 4.7
! 1.5
|}

Notes

References

External links

WAFL Player Profile and Statistics

1994 births
Living people
Fremantle Football Club players
Harvey Brunswick Leschenault Football Club players
Peel Thunder Football Club players
Swan Districts Football Club players
Australian rules footballers from Western Australia